The Nigeria national football team represents Nigeria in men's international football. Governed by the Nigeria Football Federation (NFF), they are three-time Africa Cup of Nations winners, with their most recent title in 2013. In April 1994, the Nigerian national football team was ranked 5th in the FIFA rankings, the highest FIFA ranking position ever achieved by an African football team. Throughout history, the team has qualified for six of the last eight FIFA World Cups, missing only the 2006 and 2022 editions. They have reached the round of 16 on three occasions. Their first World Cup appearance was the 1994 edition. The team is a member of FIFA and Confederation of African Football (CAF).

History

After playing other colonies in unofficial games since the 1930s, Nigeria played its first official game in October 1949, while still a British colony. The team played warm-up games in England against various amateur teams including Bromley, Dulwich Hamlet, Bishop Auckland, and South Liverpool. Nigeria's match against Marine A.F.C. at Rossett Park drew 6,000 spectators, a record for the small ground.

1963–1980

Nigeria first appeared in the Africa Cup of Nations in 1963, when they were drawn in a group with Sudan, and the then United Arab Republic. They did not advance to the next stage.

The team's first major success was a gold medal in the 2nd All-Africa games in 1973, with 3rd-place finishes in the 1976 and 1978 African Cup of Nations to follow. In 1980, with players such as Segun Odegbami and Best Ogedegbe, the team, led by Christian Chukwu, won the African Cup for the first time in Lagos. Nigeria Olympic men's football team won the football event at the 1996 Olympics in Atlanta, beating Mexico, Brazil and Argentina in the process. They were runners-up in the same event at the 2008 Olympics in Beijing, losing to Argentina in a rematch of the 1996 Final of the event.

In 1984,1988 and 2000, Nigeria reached the Cup of Nations final, losing to Cameroon. Three of the five African titles won by Cameroon have been won by defeating Nigeria. Missing out to Cameroon on many occasions has created an intense rivalry between both nations. Three notable occasions; narrowly losing out in the 1988 African Cup of Nations, qualifiers for the 1990 World Cup, and the controversial final of the 2000 African Cup of Nations where a kick taken by Victor Ikpeba during the penalty shoot-out was adjudged not to have crossed the goal-line by the referee.

The team withdrew from two African Cup of Nations between 1963 and 1974, due to political instability and in 1996. In 1976, they came back to the Cup of Nations with third-place finishes in both the 1976 and 1978 Africa cup of Nations

1980–1990
Nigeria hosted the 1980 Africa Cup of Nations and also won their first Cup of Nations Title that year in Lagos. Nigeria came out as runners-up three times and had one group stage elimination, between 1982 and 1990. They also failed to qualify for the 1986 Africa Cup of Nations hosted by Egypt.

1992–2006
Nigeria appeared again in the African Cup of Nations in 1992 and 1994, they finished third in 1992 and won the 1994 Africa Cup of Nations, which was the second time they won the tournament. 

Nigeria finally reached the World Cup for the first time in 1994 after years of struggling to get there. They were managed by Clemens Westerhof. Nigeria topped their group which included Argentina, Bulgaria, and Greece. Nigeria defeated Bulgaria 3–0, lost to Argentina 1–2, and reached the second round after a 2–0 victory over Greece. In the second round Nigeria played Italy and took the lead with a goal from Emmanuel Amunike at 25 minutes. Nigeria were within two minutes of qualifying for the Quarter-finals, but Roberto Baggio scored to take the game to extra time. He also scored the eventual winning goal. The game ended 2–1 in favour of the Italians. In 1996 the team withdrew from the tournament under pressure from the country's military dictator Sani Abacha due to the criticism received from the tournament hosts South Africa and especially its president Nelson Mandela, for the execution of Ogoni activist Ken Saro-Wiwa. Nigeria was subsequently banned from entering the 1998 African Cup of Nations.

In 1998, Nigeria returned to the World Cup alongside Cameroon, Morocco, Tunisia, and South Africa. Optimism was high due to its manager Bora Milutinović and the return of most 1994 squad members. In the final tournament Nigeria were drawn into group D with Spain, Bulgaria, Paraguay. Nigeria scored a major upset by defeating Spain 3–2 after coming back twice from being 1–0 and 2–1 down. The Eagles qualified for the second round with a win against Bulgaria and a loss to Paraguay. The team's hopes of surpassing its 1994 performance was shattered after a 1–4 loss to Denmark. This is currently the only World Cup where Nigeria qualified for without playing Argentina in the tournament finals.

In 2000 they returned to the Cup of Nations and were the runner-up and subsequently finished in third place at the 2002, 2004 and 2006 Africa Cup of Nations.

2002 and 2006 World Cups
The 2002 World Cup in South Korea and Japan saw Nigeria again qualify with optimism. With a new squad and distinctive pastel green kits, the Super Eagles were expected to build on its strong performances in the 2000 and 2002 African Cup of Nations. Nigeria were drawn into group F with powerhouses Sweden, Argentina, and England. The first game against Argentina started with a strong defence that kept the first half scoreless. In the 61st minute, Gabriel Batistuta breached the Nigerian defence to put Argentina in the lead 1–0, and Argentina would go on to win the game. Nigeria's second game against Sweden saw them take the lead but later lose 2–1. Nigeria then drew 0–0 with England and bowed out in the first round.

Nigeria failed to qualify for the 2006 World Cup after finishing level on points in the qualification group with Angola, but having an inferior record in the matches between the sides.

2008–2017

In the 2008 Africa Cup of Nations, Nigeria ended their campaign in the quarter finals after losing to Ghana. They qualified for 2010 Africa Cup of Nations, hosted by Angola, but were eliminated by Ghana in the semi-finals. They failed to qualify for the 2012 Africa Cup of Nations after ending the qualifiers with a 2–2 draw against Guinea with goals from Ikechukwu Uche and Victor Obinna.

Nigeria came back in the 2013 Africa Cup of Nations hosted in South Africa; after playing through the tournament with an unbeaten run, they defeated Burkina Faso in the finals to lift the Cup for the third time. However, they did not qualify for either of the next two tournaments.

2010 World Cup

On 14 November 2009, Nigeria qualified for the 2010 World Cup after defeating Kenya by 3–2 in Nairobi.

Nigeria lost its opening match against Argentina 1–0 at Ellis Park Stadium following a controversial Gabriel Heinze header in the 6th minute. In its second game Nigeria led early on by a goal from Kalu Uche. A red card against Sani Kaita gave Greece the advantage. Greece scored the equaliser late in the first half and Nigeria conceded the second goal in the second half and lost the game 2–1. In their last group stage match against South Korea, Nigeria took an early lead in the 12th minute off of a great finish by Kalu Uche after a low cross from Chidi Odiah.
However, goals from Lee Jung-Soo and Park Chu-Young gave South Korea a 2–1 lead, which looked to be enough for South Korea to advance into the round of 16. However, Nigeria got a chance in the 66th minute, on the end of a pass from Ayila Yussuf that was fed through the South Korean defense was none other than Yakubu, once the pass found Yakubu's foot about four yards away from the empty goal, Yakubu pushed the ball wide of the left post to leave South Korea still ahead 2–1. Three minutes later, Yakubu was able to calmly finish a penalty to knot the score at two apiece, but Nigeria was unable to score again and the match ended in a 2–2 draw.
With this result, Nigeria was eliminated from the 2010 World Cup with just one point, while South Korea advanced into the round of 16 with four points. On 30 June 2010, following the team's early exit and poor showing, the then President of Nigeria, Goodluck Jonathan suspended the national football team from international competition for two years. This suspension put the team at risk of being banned from international football by FIFA for reasons of political interference.

On 5 July 2010, the Nigerian government rescinded its ban of the national football team from FIFA/CAF football competitions, but the sanction of suspension was applied by FIFA some three months after. On 4 October 2010, Nigeria was indefinitely banned from international football due to government interference following the 2010 World Cup. Four days later, however, the ban was "provisionally lifted" until 26 October, the day after the officially unrecognised players' union - National Association of Nigerian Footballers (NANF) dropped its court case against the NFF.

2014 World Cup

Nigeria's campaign in the 2014 FIFA World Cup opened with a disappointing 0–0 draw against Iran. Four days later the team played their second game against Bosnia and Herzegovina. A controversial 29th-minute Peter Odemwingie goal gave Nigeria their first World Cup win since 1998. They faced Argentina another four days later: a 3rd minute Lionel Messi goal for the opposition was followed almost instantly with an equalizer by Ahmed Musa. Messi gave Argentina the lead back just before half-time. In the second half Musa leveled the game out again, Lionel Messi was substituted and handed over his captaincy to Marcos Rojo only for Rojo to put Argentina 3–2 ahead minutes later.

Nigeria lost the match, but still qualified for the round of 16.
In the Round of 16 Nigeria faced France, an 18th-minute stabbed shot from Emmanuel Emenike saw the ball in the net, past the French goal-keeper but the goal was ruled off-side by the linesman. Nigeria held them off until the 79th minute when a cross and a Paul Pogba header gifted France the lead. An accidental own goal by Super Eagles Captain Joseph Yobo in injury time put the result beyond any doubt: Nigeria was out. This is the third time Nigeria is eliminated in the round of 16 and they were not still able to enter the Quarter-finals in the FIFA World Cup.

2018 World Cup

On 24 June 2016, The Confederation of African Football released the draw for the 3rd round of the World Cup qualifiers which saw Nigeria grouped in what was described as a "group of death"; alongside Zambia, Algeria, and Cameroon. Nigeria started their group stage matches with a 2–1 win over Zambia in Ndola and defeated Algeria 3–1 in their second match at the Godswill Akpabio International Stadium. They went on to beat Cameroon 5–1 home and away in a back to back contest.

The Super Eagles of Nigeria became the first African team to qualify for the 2018 FIFA World Cup after beating Zambia 1–0 in Uyo. On 3 June 2018, coach Gernot Rohr unveiled a 23-man squad for the 2018 FIFA World Cup. Nigeria lost their first match of the tournament 0–2 to Croatia in Kaliningrad, before they won 2–0 in the second match against brave Iceland, with Ahmed Musa scoring both goals. Nigeria had a huge chance to qualify to the next round as Argentina was demolished 3–0 by Croatia. Despite this advantage, they lost 2–1 in their last group stage match against Argentina, with one goal by Victor Moses. For this defeat, and followed with Iceland's defeat to Croatia, Nigeria missed the opportunity to advance to the round of 16 and got eliminated from the tournament.

2019 Africa Cup of Nations
The Super Eagles started their campaign at the 2019 AFCON by defeating Burundi 1–0 in group B opening match. They went on to defeat Guinea and lost 2–0 to Madagascar in their final group stage match. The round of 16 saw the national football team of Nigeria defeating Cameroon 3–2 with goals coming from Jude Ighalo and Iwobi, they later went on to confront South Africa in the quarter-finals of the tournament. An 89th-minute header from Troost-Ekong gave Nigeria the lead over South Africa and the match ended 2–1 in favour of Nigeria. Nigeria faced Algeria in the semi-finals and were knocked out of the tournament after a 95th minute free kick from Riyad Mahrez gave Algeria the lead. The Super Eagles later faced Tunisia in a third pace match which they won 1–0 with the only goal coming from Ighalo which made him the top scorer of the tournament.

2021 Africa Cup of Nations
On 18 July 2019, the Confederation of African Football (CAF) released the draw for the 2021 Africa Cup of Nations qualification. The Super Eagles were grouped in group L alongside Lesotho, Benin, and Sierra Leone. Nigeria started out by defeating Benin 2–1 at Uyo in their first group match and later went on to beat Lesotho 4–2 in an away match. In March 2020, as a result of the COVID-19 pandemic, the CAF postponed all AFCON qualifiers indefinitely. Subsequently, on 30 June 2020, CAF rescheduled the 2021 African Cup of Nations to 2022, to take place from 9 January to 6 February 2022. The qualifiers resumed on 9 November 2020.

The 2021 AFCON started on 9 January 2022, and Nigeria was the only team in the tournament to win all three group stage matches after defeating Egypt 1–0, Sudan 3–1, and Guinea-Bissau 2–0. However, Nigeria lost 1–0 in the round of 16 to Tunisia on 23 January.

2022 World Cup 
Nigeria failed to qualify for the FIFA World Cup for the first time in 16 years, losing to Ghana on the away goals rule after drawing 0–0 in Ghana and 1–1 in Nigeria.

Team image

Kits and crest

The Nigeria national team has traditionally used a mostly-solid green on green primary set with white numbering, lettering, and highlights; coupled with all-white reversed secondary kits, all emblematic of the colours of the Nigerian flag.  The shade of green has varied over the years. An olive drab-tinged, forest green was frequently favoured during the 1980s to the early 1990s, and jade has appeared in each of those decades as well; even harlequin has been used. Over the last decade, the team has appeared to settle on the more standard office green which most closely resembles the shade used on the flag. Nigeria's first national teams used a solid scarlet top over white shorts and socks until the country adopted its current colours after its independence.

On 23 April 2015, Nike was announced to be the supplier of Nigeria's kits after Adidas ended their kit contract with the NFF. Before that, Nike supplied Nigeria's kit between 1998 and 2003.

Kit suppliers

Kit deals

Nigeria's national team image has undergone much evolution throughout its history. Prior to independence, they were called the Red Devils due to their red topped kits. The name was changed to the Green Eagles after independence in reference to the Nigerian state flag as well as the eagle which adorns the country's coat of arms. There had been deliberations for a while heading to the 1988 Africa Cup of Nations, where they were still called the Green Eagles, but at a reception after the tournament, the team's name was officially changed to the "Super Eagles". Today, only the senior men's national team uses the nickname. The women's national team is called the "Super Falcons", and Nigeria's underage male teams are nicknamed the "Flying Eagles" & the "Golden Eaglets".

Media coverage
The Nigerian football federation currently has an active deal with the parent company of AIT and Ray Power Radio. Internationally, Nigeria's qualifiers and African Cup matches are regularly broadcast abroad by the multi-platform international sports network, beIN Sports and South African broadcaster SuperSport. Nigeria's international friendlies are regularly scheduled in the UK through independent organisers are marketed to the country's large population of Nigerian expatriates.

Supporters

Though the club is most notable at Nigeria's home matches wearing green-themed embroidered outfits specific to the club along with wigs, hats and large sunglasses while dancing, singing, playing drums and trumpets, as well as carrying pom poms, culturally significant objects, inflatable beachballs, and waving flags; they have also shown a presence travelling abroad to support Nigeria in away matches. However, the club's efforts at improving the atmosphere at Nigeria's home and away matches are beset by funding issues, corruption and infighting. The club's current head, Dr. Rafiu Ladipo, has drawn criticism from its membership and is under pressure to defer the leadership to one of his deputies.

A regular sight at Nigerian home matches is also their brass and percussion band, whose rendition of well-known Highlife songs provides Nigerian home matches with a unique feel.  In Nigeria, these performers are occasionally conspicuous with their military uniforms or they may be members of the Football Supporters Club. A popular chant among supporters from all over the country, after a goal scored, is "Oshe Baba!", which means "Thank you father!" in Yoruba.

Rivalries

Ghana

Many important matches have been played against various nations who have been occasional rivals.  Of these nations, Ghana is widely considered Nigeria's primary rival as the two sides have met one another more than any other opponent, as well as being two of the most successful national teams in Africa. Nigeria has enjoyed periods of success. The most notable of these periods are the early contests during the 1950s, and matches that took place in the early 2000s.FIFA lists the first official match between the two as a World Cup qualifier match in 1960. However both national teams had already engaged in competitive matches dating back to 1950. The national teams of these two West African countries were formed during the time in which both remained protectorates of the British Empire. At that time the modern-day nation of Ghana was known as the Gold Coast. Nigeria, prior to adopting the national colours of green and white, wore scarlet tops over white shorts and were known as the "Red Devils". The two sides played for several rivalry and tournament cups during this period in which full international competition was barred to them. The encounter between these two teams is commonly known as the Jollof Derby.

Cameroon
Nigeria's neighbours to the east, Cameroon, have also played Nigeria a number of times over the years. The teams have met three times in the final of the African Cup of Nations with Cameroon winning each time. Both carry histories of continental success and World Cup representation that is nearly unrivaled on the African continent.

Their rivalry began in 1960 and since then, Nigeria has proved to be a more dominating team, but in all three AFCON Final matches at 1984, 1988 and 2000, Cameroon have all prevailed over Nigeria.

Nigeria has qualified for six FIFA World Cup finals, advancing from the group stage three times (1994, 1998 and 2014), getting knocked out in the round of 16 all three times, while Cameroon has qualified seven times, advancing from the group stage only once (1990) though they made it to the quarter-finals in that edition.

Other African nations
There is also a number of competitive matches with Algeria dating back to the 1970s. The two sides met twice in the African Cup of Nations finals, with each nation splitting the win totals. It was a 1–1 draw in Algeria on 8 October 1993 that enabled Nigeria to claim its first World Cup berth in the 1994 edition of the tournament. Nigeria since then had an undefeated streak to Algeria, until the semi-finals of the 2019 Africa Cup of Nations when Algeria prevailed over Nigeria.

Nigeria's western neighbour, Benin, has played competitive matches with the team since the period of European colonisation when they were known as Dahomey. But with only two wins and two draws to Benin's credit against Nigeria's fourteen wins, and with the sides having only met six times since 1980, Benin remains a lightly regarded opponent.

Argentina 

In five of its first six World Cup appearances, Nigeria was drawn in the group stage with three-time champion Argentina and is regarded by many fans as having fairly acquitted themselves against the footballing giant. The fixture is the most common in the competition's history involving an African nation. All five matches have been won by Argentina, but all were by a one-goal margin (2–1 in 1994, 1–0 in 2002, 1–0 in 2010, 3–2 in 2014 and 2–1 in 2018) and have been tightly contested. To date Nigeria has recorded two wins against Argentina's six, with the victories occurring during friendly matches. Nigeria came close to defeating Argentina in their first meeting, during which they held a lead for some minutes of the match. This was followed by a Confederations Cup match in 1995 which saw Nigeria hold the South Americans to a 0–0 draw. Below full international level, their Olympic teams also faced off in the gold medal match in 1996 (3–2 to Nigeria), and 2008 (1–0 to Argentina). The final of the 2005 FIFA World Youth Championship was also played between them; both Argentina goals in their 2–1 win were scored by Lionel Messi, who would go on to find the net for the senior team in the 2014 and 2018 World Cup fixtures.

The match-up holds some importance to many Nigerian football fans who regard the challenge as an important measuring stick for the development of Nigerian football. Argentinean fans for their part, typically do not regard Nigeria as a rival. Although it means less to Argentinean fans, matches against Nigeria are always seen as needed to be played with caution.

Home stadium

The Moshood Abiola National Stadium (formerly known as National Stadium, Abuja) serves as the official home stadium of the Super Eagles. Several international matches are played in other stadiums across the country.  However, since the construction of Godswill Akpabio International Stadium in Uyo, Akwa Ibom State, most of the Super Eagles' important home matches have been played there.

Super Eagles match venues

Recent results and fixtures
 

The following is a list of match results in the last 12 months, as well as any future matches that have been scheduled.

2022

2023

Coaching staff 
The Current Nigerian Super Eagles managerial staff is made up of a technical adviser who serves as the coach in charge of full international matches and a chief coach who serves as the first assistant coach. The Second Assistant coach is in charge of the home-based Super Eagles as well as the CHAN tournament and other home based competitions. Other positions also include the technical assistants and the goalkeeper trainer.

Coaching history
Caretaker managers are listed in italics.

 Jack Finch (1949)
 Adewale Adegoke (1950–1952)
 Daniel Anyiam (1954–1956)
 Les Courtier (1956–1960)
 Jerry Beit haLevi (1960–1961)
 George Vardar (1961–1963)
 Jorge Penna (1963–1964)
 Daniel Anyiam (1964–1965)
 József Ember (1965–1968)
 Sabino Barinaga (1968–1969)
 Peter Amaechina (1969–1970)
 Karl-Heinz Marotzke (1970–1972)
 Jorge Penna (1972–1973)
 Karl-Heinz Marotzke (1973–1974)
 Tiko Jelisavčić (1974–1978)
 Otto Glória (1978–1981)
 Gottlieb Göller (1981)
 Adegboyega Onigbinde (1981–1984)
 Chris Udemezue (1984–1986)
 Manfred Höner (1987–1988)
 Paul Hamilton (1989)
 Clemens Westerhof (1989–1994)
 Shuaibu Amodu (1994–1995)
 Jo Bonfrère (1995–1996)
 Shuaibu Amodu (1996–1997)
 Philippe Troussier (1997)
 Bora Milutinović (1997–1998)
 Thijs Libregts (1998–1999)
  Jo Bonfrère (1999–2001)
 Shuaibu Amodu (2001–2002)
 Festus Onigbinde (2002)
 Christian Chukwu (2003–2005)
 Augustine Eguavoen (2005–2007)
 Berti Vogts (2007–2008)
 Shuaibu Amodu (2008–2010)
 Augustine Eguavoen (2010)
 Samson Siasia (2010–2011)
 Stephen Keshi (2011–2014)
 Shuaibu Amodu (2014)
 Stephen Keshi (2015)
 Shuaibu Amodu (2015)
 Sunday Oliseh (2015–2016)
 Samson Siasia (2016)
 Salisu Yusuf (2016)
 Gernot Rohr (2016–2021)
 Augustine Eguavoen (2021–2022)
 José Peseiro (2022–present)

Players

Current squad 
The following players were called up for the 2023 AFCON qualification matches against Guinea Bissau on 23 and 28 March 2023.

Caps and goals correct as of 17 November 2022, after the match against .

Recent call-ups
The following players have also been called up to the Nigeria squad within the last 12 months.

INJ Withdrew because of an injury
PRE Preliminary squad

Records

Players in bold are still active with Nigeria.

Most appearances

Top goalscorers

Competitive record

FIFA World Cup record

Notes

African Cup of Nations

*Denotes draws including knockout matches decided via a penalty shoot-out.
**Red border color indicates tournament was held on home soil.

African Nations Championship

WAFU Nations Cup record

FIFA Confederations Cup

Olympic Games record

African Games

Honours

Intercontinental
FIFA World Cup
Round of 16: 1994, 1998, 2014
 FIFA Confederations Cup
Fourth-place: 1995
Afro-Asian Cup of Nations
Winners: 1995

Continental
 Africa Cup of Nations
Winners: 1980, 1994, 2013
Runners-up: 1984, 1988, 1990, 2000
Third-place: 1976, 1978, 1992, 2002, 2004, 2006, 2010, 2019
African Nations Championship
Runners-up: 2018
Third-place: 2014
Football at the African Games
Gold medalists: 1973
Silver medalist: 1978

Sub-Continental
WAFU
Winners: 2010
Runners-up: 2011, 2017
CSSA Nations Cup
Third-place: 1987
WASF Championship
Runners-up: 1960
Third-place: 1963
CEDEAO Cup
Winners: 1977, 1990
Runners-up: 1983
Fourth-place: 1991

Others
Unity World Cup
Winners: 2014
WAFU Unity Cup
Runners-up: 2005
Ethiopia Tournament
Runners-up: 1992
Hassan II Trophy
Fourth-place: 1996
Catalonia International Trophy.
Winners: 2012

Awards
World Team of the Year
Winners: 1996
FIFA Best Mover of the Year
Winners: 2000
African National Team of the Year
Best Team: 4 (1992, 1993, 1994, 2013)
Second Best Team: 3 (1980, 2001, 2014)
Third Best Team: 6 (1983, 1984, 1988, 1998, 2002, 2004)

See also

 Nigeria national football team
 Nigeria national under-23 football team
 Nigeria national under-20 football team
 Nigeria national under-17 football team
 Nigeria national futsal team
 Nigeria national under-20 futsal team
 Nigeria national beach soccer team
 Nigeria women's national football team
 Nigeria women's national under-20 football team
 Nigeria women's national under-17 football team
 Nigeria women's national futsal team

References

External links

 Nigeria Football Federation official site
 FIFA profile
Super Eagles AFCON squad 2022 revealed on Naija News 247
 GreenEagles.org – Unofficial Database of The Super Eagles of Nigeria
 Super Eagles returns Teslim Balogun Stadium, Lagos, after 10 years NaijaNews247
 RSSSF archive of results 1955–2008

 
African national association football teams
N